The Volunteer Corps was a British voluntary part-time organization for the purpose of home defence in the event of invasion, during the French Revolutionary and Napoleonic Wars.

History

Establishment
At the start of the War of the First Coalition, the Secretary of State for War, Henry Dundas, began to receive "a great number of Letters", from people living in coastal areas, requesting arms and equipment so that they could defend their localities against any French incursions. The government firmly rejected proposals from Kent and Chichester to form "military associations" but similar bodies were formed in Brighton, Rye, Lindfield and Penzance without any official sanction. Dundas had also received more practical proposals for volunteer forces from the Marquess of Buckingham, Arthur Young and General Sir William Erskine. All this led Dundas together with Lord Amherst, to formulate plans for volunteer forces, which were sent to the king for approval in February 1794. On 14 March, the "Plan of Augmentation for the Forces for Internal Defence" were circulated to the lords lieutenant, who would have a central role in creating the new forces. William Pitt the Younger's government ensured the passage of the Volunteer Act 1794 through Parliament in the same month.

The lords lieutenant were tasked with organising committees and obtaining subscriptions from wealthy donors, to raise and support the Volunteers. Local companies or "corps" of Volunteers fulfilled three roles; to man coastal artillery batteries, to augment the regular Militia in the infantry role, and to form cavalry troops, which were called Yeomanry.

The government became concerned that there were too few Volunteer or Yeomanry Cavalry and passed the Provisional Cavalry Act 1796. This act established the Provisional Cavalry, a force liable for service anywhere in the country.  The members of these units were recruited by requiring one man to be provided for service by each man who owned ten or more horses (those who owned fewer horses were collected into groups which were each required to provide one man).  Later in 1797 an amendment was passed by parliament which removed the requirement to raise a Provisional Cavalry unit in counties where the Yeomanry already amounted to 75% of the strength required by the Provisional Cavalry Act.  This proved to be the case in the majority of counties owing to the strength of the Yeomanry which was a more popular option for the country gentry.

Initially recruitment was slow but the invasion of Belgium and the 1794 Treason Trials caused an increase in volunteers.  Further recruits were brought in by Pitt's appeal for volunteers in 1798, which came as Britain was facing the loss of Europe, failed peace negotiations, manpower shortages in the army, financial problems and potential rebellion in Ireland. At its height more than 300,000 men were members of the Corps and other volunteer units, a number matched by the regular army and militia only at the very end of the Napoleonic Wars.  The success of the volunteer corps partly enabled Britain to avoid the costly and unpopular measure of mass conscription.

Composition
The Volunteer Corps typically drew its members from the propertied classes. Officers were usually members of the gentry (though some junior officers were members of the professional or middle classes) and the enlisted ranks tended to be from the lower middle classes (for example shopkeepers and publicans).  The failed Expédition d'Irlande of 1796 and invasion at Fishguard caused the expansion of the corps, including the formation of workplace units such as the 863-strong Cyfarthfa Ironworks unit in South Wales, in which the enlisted ranks were filled by the workmen and the officers were drawn from the clerks and foremen. Such units, made up of working-class men, became more common in the late 1790s and early 1800s due to the increased fear of invasion.    Indeed, there was at least one case of de facto conscription, in which a factory-owner decreed that all his workers must join the corps or else be sacked.

The Volunteer Corps were occasionally used to keep the peace in Britain but proved unreliable. One unit in Wolverhampton refused to act against food rioters and several volunteers in Devon actually led riots directed at farmers and millers in the winter of 1800–01.

Termination
The infantry volunteers (but not the Yeomanry or artillery) were disbanded at the Peace of Amiens in 1802, but reformed the following year when Napoleon's planned invasion became a serious threat. By the end of 1803, more than 340,000 had enrolled, far more than Henry Addington's government had planned for, and there were initially insufficient weapons and equipment for them. William Pitt, then in opposition, became the colonel of the Volunteer Corps at Walmer despite his frail health. The Volunteer Act and Provisional Cavalry Act were allowed to lapse by the government in 1806.   They were disbanded again during 1813, except for the Yeomanry who were retained in case of civil insurrection.

Notable Volunteers
 Robert Burns, private, Royal Dumfries Volunteers
 David Erskine, lieutenant colonel,  Bloomsbury and Inns of Court Volunteers
 William Grant, captain,  Bloomsbury and Inns of Court Volunteers
 Edward Austen Knight (brother of Jane Austen), captain, East Kent Volunteers
 William Pitt the Younger, colonel of the Royal Trinity House Volunteer Artillery and the Cinque Ports Volunteer Corps
 Walter Scott, Quartermaster and Secretary of the Royal Edinburgh Volunteer Light Dragoons
 Richard Brinsley Sheridan, lieutenant colonel, St James's Volunteer Corps

Footnotes

 
Military units and formations established in 1794
Military units and formations of the British Army
Napoleon's planned invasion of the United Kingdom
1794 establishments in Great Britain